Ali Zamin (also Romanized as ‘Ālī Zamīn and ‘Alī Zamīn) is a village in Esbu Kola Rural District, in the Central District of Babol County, Mazandaran Province, Iran. At the 2006 census, its population was 497, in 118 families.

References 

Populated places in Babol County